Melvyn Jones (born 26 January 1964 in Stourbridge) is a British slalom canoeist who competed from the mid-1980s to the mid-1990s.

He won three medals at the ICF Canoe Slalom World Championships with two golds (K1 team: 1987, 1993) and a bronze (K1: 1993).

Jones also finished seventh in the K1 event at the 1992 Summer Olympics in Barcelona.

His wife, Elisabeth, won a gold medal for Germany in the women's K1 event at those same games.

World Cup individual podiums

References

External links

1964 births
English male canoeists
Canoeists at the 1992 Summer Olympics
Living people
Olympic canoeists of Great Britain
Sportspeople from Stourbridge
British male canoeists
Medalists at the ICF Canoe Slalom World Championships